Almenêches is a commune in the Orne department in north-western France.

Population
The inhabitants are known as Almenéchois.

Heraldry

See also
 Communes of the Orne department

References

Communes of Orne